Botha is a hamlet in central Alberta, Canada within the County of Stettler No. 6.

History 
The community was founded in 1909 around the train station named after Louis Botha. Botha then incorporated as a village on September 5, 1911. It dissolved from village status 106 years later on September 1, 2017, becoming a hamlet under the jurisdiction of the County of Stettler No. 6.

Demographics 

As a designated place in the 2016 Census of Population conducted by Statistics Canada, Botha had a population of 204 living in 80 of its 81 total private dwellings, a  change from its 2011 population of 175.

Education 
Botha School is part of Clearview Public Schools.

See also 
List of communities in Alberta
List of hamlets in Alberta

References 

1911 establishments in Alberta
2017 disestablishments in Alberta
Designated places in Alberta
Former villages in Alberta
Hamlets in Alberta